Bal Ram Nanda (1917 – 30 May 2010) was a writer from New Delhi, India. He was the preeminent Indian biographer of Mahatma Gandhi.

Career
After studying student of History at Lahore University, B.R. Nanda joined the Indian Railways Services, of which he was a senior railway officer.

He was the first Director of the Nehru Memorial Museum & Library, New Delhi.

Awards
Padma Bhushan, 1988, 
Padma Vibhushan, 2003.

Death
Nanda died on 30 May 2010 at his New Delhi residence.

Works
Mahatma Gandhi: A biography (translated into French, Spanish, Italian and several Indian languages). 
Gandhi and his critics 
Gokhale, Gandhi, and the Nehrus
In Search of Gandhi: Essays and Reflections 
Gandhi: pan-Islamism, imperialism, and nationalism in India  
Motilal Nehru (Builders of modern India), Publications Division, Ministry of Information and Broadcasting, Govt. of India, 1964
Socialism in India, Nehru Memorial Museum and Library. Vikas Publications, 1972

Gandhi and his critics, Oxford Univ. Pr., 1985
Road to Pakistan 2010

References

External links
 

20th-century Indian historians
20th-century Indian biographers
1917 births
2010 deaths
Historians of South Asia
Indian civil servants
Indian Railways officers
People from New Delhi
Recipients of the Padma Bhushan in literature & education
Recipients of the Padma Vibhushan in literature & education
Writers from Delhi
20th-century Indian male writers